Bryogomphus is a genus of lichenized fungi in the family Pilocarpaceae. This is a monotypic genus, containing the single species Bryogomphus caribaeus.

References

Pilocarpaceae
Lichen genera
Lecanorales genera
Taxa named by Emmanuël Sérusiaux
Taxa named by Robert Lücking
Taxa described in 2005